Margaret Baldwin may refer to:

Margaret Baldwin Weis (born 1948), American fantasy and science fiction writer
Peggy Baldwin, fictional character from All for Peggy
Margaret Baldwin (playwright) at Offstage Theatre